Princess Anna Zofia Sapieha (17 October 1799 – 24 November 1864) was a Polish noblewoman, notable as a philanthropist.

In France she was active in the Polish emigree community (Hôtel Lambert). She was particularly known for her charity activities.

She married Prince Adam Jerzy Czartoryski on 25 September 1817 in Radzyń.

1799 births
1864 deaths
People from Saint-Germain-en-Laye
Anna Zofia